The 2014–15 Maltese Premier League is the 100th season of the Maltese Premier League, Valletta are the defending champions, having won their 22nd title the previous season.

The Premier League consists of three rounds for a total of 33 games. After the end of the second round, the points earned are halved.

Format
In a change from last season, the league will not split after twenty-two matches. All teams will advance to a second phase where half of the first phase points are carried over and teams will play each other once.

Venues

Teams

Relegation and promotion 
Vittoriosa Stars and Rabat Ajax were relegated finishing 11th and 12th, respectively, in the previous season.

Promoted were, Pietà Hotspurs and Zebbug Rangers finishing 1st and 2nd, respectively, in the First Division the previous season.

First round

League table

Results (matches 1-22)

Second round
All teams advance to the second round. Teams keep their records from the first round, but their points from the first round are halved. Teams will play each other once.

League table

Results (matches 23-33)

Premier League play-off
A play-off was played between the tenth placed team from the Premier League and the third placed team from the First Division. The winner will compete in the 2015–16 Maltese Premier League.

Top goalscorers

Source: MFA

References

External links
 MaltaFootball.com website

Maltese Premier League seasons
Malta
1